The Prebendal School is a private preparatory school in Chichester, situated adjacent to the Chichester Cathedral precinct. It is a boarding and day school educating the cathedral choristers. The school has ancient origins as the medieval cathedral song school at the thirteenth-century school house in West Street.

In 2020, The Telegraph named The Prebendal School as one of the best-value independent schools in the country.

History
The Prebendal is the oldest school in Sussex and probably dates back to the foundation of Chichester Cathedral in the eleventh century when it was a 'song school', teaching and housing the choristers. It was later extended to admitting other boys from the city and neighbouring areas. In 1497, it was re-founded as a grammar school by the Bishop of Chichester, Edward Story, who also attached it to the Prebend of Highleigh in Chichester Cathedral, hence the name of the school.

The thirteenth-century school house with its narrow tower still stands in West Street. Long dormitory, on the top floor, contains 300-year-old panelling, featuring some historic graffiti. Two adjoining eighteenth-century houses have been added, while the addition in 1966 of the east wing of the Bishop's Palace, which is next door to the main school buildings, provides considerable extra space. Further renovations have provided an assembly hall, new classrooms and an art room. There is a modern science laboratory and an ICT room. In 2012, the school expanded into adjoining period properties on West Street.

Girls were introduced into the school in 1972. The school is now a co-educational, day and boarding preparatory school for children between 3 and 13 years of age.

Due to its poor financial position, exacerbated by the coronavirus pandemic, the school confirmed in April 2021 that it was seeking external financial support. In July 2021 it confirmed that it had been acquired by the Alpha Schools Group.

In December 2021, it was announced that girls would benefit from the same opportunity to be Choristers at the cathedral whilst being educated at the school.

Structure
The school consists of the Pre-Prep (Nursery to Year 2) and the Prep (Years 3–8). Each pupil is a member of a school house, which are named after former Bishops of Chichester. There is also a boarding house that accommodate up to 46 boarders. The school remains open for Choristers in the weeks prior to Christmas, Easter and the Southern Cathedrals Festival. The Nursery, Pelicans, is open throughout the normal school holidays.

Academia

Pupils are taught the Common Entrance or Common Academic Scholarship examination to senior independent schools, offered by the Independent Schools Examinations Board. School examinations take place once a year during the summer term. However, the teaching is underpinned by the Pre-Senior Baccalaureate (PSB) core skills of Thinking and Learning, Reviewing and Improving, Communicating, Collaboration and Leadership. The PSB is designed to encourage strong partnerships between parents and schools that promote an understanding of how each individual child learns.

In 2018, 1:1 iPads were introduced for older pupils and technology was embedded throughout the daily curriculum enabling pupils to develop skills that would enable them to incorporate purposeful technology into school life in preparation for senior school. This facilitated a smooth transfer to remote learning in 2020 when schools had to close due to the COVID-19 pandemic.

In 2019, 71% of Year 8 leavers were awarded a scholarship to their senior school. In 2020, this had risen to 82%. Scholarships gained in recent years have included schools such as Eton, Harrow, Charterhouse, Lancing, Portsmouth Grammar School and Benenden.

Music
As a choir school educating the cathedral choristers, the school has an extremely strong music department.
Concerts take place throughout the academic year. many concerts are informal, but a number are performed in Chichester Cathedral. Music competitions are also arranged in school: the inter-house music and house singing competitions being notable examples. Since 2006, the school has applied a policy of "Music for All", in which each pupil receives a musical instrument education during their time, with a wide variety of instruments on offer. There are many groups, including two choirs, a full orchestra, concert band, ensembles of string, woodwind, brass, and percussion instruments, a Baroque trio and many other chamber groups.

Sport
The school enjoys eight acres of playing fields that run alongside the historic city walls. Good use is made of other local facilities, including those of the adjacent Chichester College and Westgate Leisure Centre.

Outdoor education
The Prebendal School is a Beach School, offering fortnightly outdoor learning sessions at West Wittering and Bracklesham Bay for the Pre-Prep. The school has a well-equipped outdoor classroom on site that is used across the curriculum. Forest School sessions take place either on the school campus or in the Bishop's Palace Gardens.

Heads
The following list includes Heads of the school prior to its re-founding in 1497:

Old Prebendalians
Alumni are known as Old Prebendalians. Notable Old Prebendalians include:

 William Juxon (1582–1663), Archbishop of Canterbury (1660–1663)
 John Selden (1584–1654), jurist, philosopher and parliamentarian
 William Cawley (1602–1667), politician and regicide of Charles I
 William Collins (1721–1759), poet
 James Hurdis (1763–1801), clergyman and Professor of Poetry at Oxford University (1793–1801)
 Charles Gordon-Lennox, 5th Duke of Richmond (1791–1860), MP for Chichester (1812–1819) and Postmaster General (1830–1834)
 Horatio Nelson, 3rd Earl Nelson (1823–1913), politician
 Edward B. Titchener (1867–1927), psychologist who developed the theory of structuralism
 MacDonald Gill (1884–1947), graphic designer, cartographer, artist and architect
 Christina Bassadone (1981–), sailor who competed in the 2008 Summer Olympics
 Isaac Waddington (1999–), singer, pianist and finalist on the ninth series of Britain's Got Talent

See also
 List of independent schools in England

References

External links
The Prebendal School website
Profile on West Sussex County Council website
Ofsted Inspection Reports

Choir schools in England
Preparatory schools in West Sussex
Education in Chichester
Educational institutions established in the 15th century
1497 establishments in England